Pianoa is a monotypic genus of large-clawed spiders endemic to New Zealand. It contains a single species, Pianoa isolata, known commonly as the piano flat spider.

It was first described by Raymond Robert Forster, Norman I. Platnick & Michael R. Gray in 1987.

Distribution 
The piano flat spider is found throughout the Waikaia Forest and at other locations in northern Southland and west Otago.

Description 
Juveniles are pale white with no markings, but develop pigmentation after several molts.

Egg sacs are pale cream or white in colour.

Habitat 
P. isolata has been observed living in leaf litter and rotting logs on the forest floor.

Behaviour and diet 
The piano flat spider is nocturnal. It is an active hunter and does not build a web, instead using a large claw on the end of its first and second legs to seize prey, which it bites repeatedly.

Egg-sacs are laid in the cavities of fallen logs in late spring to early summer. After three to four weeks, juveniles emerge from a small hole at the base of the egg-sac.

Conservation 
The piano flat spider is classified as At Risk (Relict) by the Department of Conservation.

References

Gradungulidae
Monotypic Araneomorphae genera
Spiders of New Zealand
Taxa named by Raymond Robert Forster